Glenn Cook is a British former professional triathlete, Team GB Olympic Women's head coach, London 2012 selector and now working as a triathlon coach in Eastbourne.

Personal life
Glenn lives with his partner Sarah Coope in Eastbourne, a fellow highly successful former professional triathlete.

The couple have four daughters. Chloe Cook (born 1994) is a professional triathlete competing at short (ITU) and middle distance (Ironman 70.3).

Ysabel cook and Grace cook are their two middle children who are succeeding and have many aspirations outside of triathlon.

Their youngest daughter Beth Cook is also an aspiring triathlete.

Triathlon career

Coaching career

Cook was appointed as British Triathlon's Olympic Head Women's Coach in June 2011, Olympic selector in 2012 and was instrumental in the performances of the Team GB women at London 2012, namely Helen Jenkins, Vicky Holland and Lucy Hall.

References 

Living people
Triathlon coaches
English male triathletes
Date of birth missing (living people)
Year of birth missing (living people)
British Olympic coaches
Coaches at the 2012 Summer Olympics